The rangeomorphs are a form taxon of frondose Ediacaran fossils that are united by a similarity to Rangea. Some researchers, such as Pflug and Narbonne, suggest that a natural taxon Rangeomorpha may include all similar-looking fossils. Rangeomorphs appear to have had an effective reproductive strategy, based on analysis of the distribution pattern of Fractofusus misrai, which consisted of sending out a waterborne asexual propagule to a distant area, and then spreading rapidly from there, just as plants today spread by stolons or runners.

They were especially abundant in the early Ediacaran Mistaken Point assemblage found in Newfoundland.

Body plan 

Rangeomorphs consist of branching "frond" elements, each a few centimetres long, each of which is composed of many smaller branching tubes held up by a semi-rigid organic skeleton. This self-similar structure proceeds over four levels of fractality, and could have been formed using fairly simple developmental patterns.

Ecology 

Rangeomorphs dwelt in shallow to abyssal marine environments, were unable to move, and had no apparent reproductive organs. They possibly reproduced asexually by dropping off new fronds. There is little evidence of a gut or mouth, while the organisms have high surface area to volume ratios, which has led to the hypothesis that they gathered nutrients from seawater by osmosis. However, others argue this is implausible and suggest filter feeding or other mechanisms. Most were attached to the sea floor by a stalk or holdfast, although others (such as the spindle-shaped Fractofusus) lay flat on the sediment surface.

Affinity 

Rangeomorph communities are similar in structure to those of modern, suspension-feeding animals, but it is difficult to relate their morphology to any modern animals. They have at times been aligned to a range of modern animal and protist groups, but none of these classifications has withstood scrutiny; they probably represent an extinct stem group to either the animals or fungi.  Whilst the fractal construction may represent a convergent adaptation to osmotic feeding, most workers now consider it to be an apomorphy which establishes the rangeomorph clade as a valid taxonomic entity.  The quilted construction suggests a close affinity to the erniettomorphs.

References

External links 

 Jeff Hecht: Fractal patterns of early life revealed. On: New Scientist. 15 July 2004
 Tia Ghose: Gone! Why Ancient Fractal Creatures Vanished. On: LiveScience. 11 August 2014 – Artist's reconstruction
 Brandon Specktor: This 500 million-year-old 'social network' may have helped sea monsters clone themselves. On: LiveScience. 5 March 2020

Ediacaran life
Incertae sedis
 
Petalonamae